The Vera Project, or VERA, is an all-ages, non-profit youth arts organization in Seattle, Washington.

Overview
Based on the Vera club in Groningen, Netherlands.  The name Vera comes from the phrase Veri Et Recti Amici, which is Latin meaning "true and sincere friends". Seattle's VERA Project was founded in 2001 by James Keblas, Shannon Stewart  (both studied at the University of Groningen in 1999), and Kate Becker (founder of the Old Redmond Firehouse), along with the help of many other community organizers and the City of Seattle.

A good description of the project is a quote from its own website:
Vera is an all-ages volunteer fueled music and arts venue. By engaging participants at all levels of music production and community organizing, Vera strives to fulfill its mission to foster a participatory creative culture through popular music concerts, arts programs, experiential learning and volunteer opportunities for all ages, especially young people. Vera’s programs are always all ages, with a focus on young people ages 14 to 24. Most Vera programs are at the Seattle Center venue, and include:

 Popular music concerts
 Audio engineering training
 Youth-driven governance
 Visual art exhibits
 Live and studio recording
 Leadership training
 Silkscreen printing/classes
 Event production training
 Internships
 
These activities are initiated and driven collaboratively by Vera’s volunteers, staff, Board of Directors and youth-led Membership.

Events
The Vera Project's first event was hosted on January 27, 2001 at the IBEW Local 46  and featured local artists The Murder City Devils, Botch and The Blood Brothers. Almost 1,000 people attended including local press and city officials. The Vera Project went on to host several more shows at IBEW Local 46 and then moved on to the Theatre Off Jackson when their lease expired at the IBEW Local 46. The Vera Project hosted shows at the Theatre Off Jackson until they found a longer-lasting home at 1916 4th Ave in 2002  that would be demolished a few years later for new development. The Vera Project hosted shows at various venues in Seattle until their current location, the corner of Warren Ave N. and Republican at the Seattle Center, was finished in 2007.  The new Vera is open for business and hosting about two shows a week, along with a variety of other arts and media-related programming.

The Vera Project has hosted many successful local and national music acts including Kaina, Band of Horses, Chairlift, Dan Deacon, The Evens, Fruit Bats, Harvey Danger, Lightning Bolt, Minus the Bear, Murs, No Age, Shellac, The Shins, TV on the Radio, Weezer, WHY?, Quasi, Health, Surfer Blood, The Gossip, Fleet Foxes, Macklemore, Car Seat Headrest, and Titus Andronicus. The  Bellevue, Seattle and  West Seattle versions of the  School of Rock perform shows frequently at this venue.

See also
Youth voice
Youth-led media
ABC No Rio
924 Gilman
Lemp Neighborhood Arts Center

References

External links

the Vera Project website
Washington Youth Voice Handbook includes the VERA Project
The Seattle Foundation web page for the Vera Project

Youth-led media
Social centres in the United States
Non-profit organizations based in Seattle
Arts organizations established in 2001
All-ages DIY venues in the United States